This is an episode list for the American animated television series Krypto the Superdog which aired on Cartoon Network.

Series overview

Episodes
All episodes were directed by Scott Jeralds.

Season 1 (2005)

Season 2 (2006)

External links
 

Lists of DC Comics animated television series episodes
Lists of American children's animated television series episodes
Lists of Canadian children's animated television series episodes
Lists of Cartoon Network television series episodes
2000s television-related lists